Harold George Lee Sr. (October 7, 1910 – October 16, 1977) was an American college basketball player who played for the University of Washington during the  1930s. He was voted as a consensus NCAA All-American as a senior in 1933–34 after guiding the Huskies to the Pacific Coast Conference championship. Lee also played for the football and baseball teams.

References

1910 births
1977 deaths
All-American college men's basketball players
Amateur Athletic Union men's basketball players
Baseball players from Washington (state)
Basketball players from Washington (state)
People from Bremerton, Washington
Point guards
Washington Huskies baseball players
Washington Huskies football players
Washington Huskies men's basketball players
American men's basketball players